Longshan Subdistrict is a subdistrict situated in southern Huairou District, Beijing, China. It borders Quanhe Subdistrict in the north, Miaocheng Town in the south, and surrounded by Huairou Town in the east and west sides. It had a population of 74596 as of the 2020 census.

This subdistrict was formed in 2002. Its name, Longshan, literally translates to "Dragon Mountain".

Administrative divisions 
As of 2021, Longshan Subdistrict has 16 subdivisions, 12 of them are communities and 4 are villages:

See also 

 List of township-level divisions of Beijing

References 

Huairou District
Subdistricts of Beijing